Bleibtreu may refer to:

 Georg Bleibtreu (1828-1892), German painter
 Karl Bleibtreu (1859-1928), German writer 
 Marcel Bleibtreu (1918-2001), French activist and theorist
 Monica Bleibtreu (1944-2009), Austrian actress
 Moritz Bleibtreu (born 1971), German actor, son of Monica
 Hedwig Bleibtreu (1868-1958), Austrian actress